Star Industry are a gothic rock band formed in 1996 in Belgium. They have since released four studio albums, a live album and three EPs.

The four-piece band frequently plays tours and genre festivals. Among the goth scene the most well known hit is the track Nineties, which in 1998 topped the Israeli alternative music chart.

Discography
on Revelation Records:
Iron Dust Crush (1997)

on Purple Moon Records:
Iron Dust Crush (1998), re-release, contains two additional live tracks.
New Millennium E.P. (2000), four-track CD single.
Velvet (2001), contains a cover version of the Roxette hit The Look

on Alfa Matrix Records:
Last Crusades (2007), limited first edition ("SuperBox") with additional re-mix CD and an album cover T-shirt.
Velvet (2008), re-release
black angel - white dEVIL (2008), Live album recorded at La Sala club in Madrid on 15 April 2007, a limited first edition contains the re-issue of the deleted Iron Dust Crush album in double CD format.  
Eilyne E.P. (2014), four-track digital-only single.
The Renegade (2015), also available as limited edition with additional bonus CD.

Self-released:
The Devil in Disguise EP (2016), limited edition of 100 copies which were given away to fans attending the gig at Death Disco club in Athens on 26 June 2016.

Tribute compilation appearances:
Re:Covered - A Tribute to Depeche Mode Vol. 1 (Alfa Matrix, 2009) - Enjoy the Silence
A Strange Play - A Tribute to The Cure (Alfa Matrix, 2014) - The Walk (Club Edit)
Recovery for You - A Tribute to Front 242 (Alfa Matrix, 2016) - Tragedy for you
A MAGNIS MAXIMA - A Tribute to Das Projekt (unknown, 2016) - Dream Never Ends
Re:Covered - A Tribute to Depeche Mode Vol. 3 (Alfa Matrix, 2019) - Stripped

References

External links
Official Site
Official Myspace
Star Industry at Discogs.com
Star Industry at Last.fm
Star Industry at Musicfolio.com
Star Industry fan site - contains detailed discography on Purple Moon releases

Belgian heavy metal musical groups